The FairBreak Invitational T20 is a women's Twenty20 cricket competition. The tournament, sanctioned by the ICC, is privately-run by FairBreak Global, a company that aims to promote gender equality. Players from around the world play in the tournament, spread across six teams.

The inaugural tournament took place in Dubai in 2022. Two more editions of the tournament will take place in 2023, one in Hong Kong and one in the USA.

History
The tournament was set up by FairBreak Global, with the aim of improving differences in pay, quality of play, and opportunity between men and women in cricket. Starting in 2013, FairBreak teams were fielded in exhibition matches. The first FairBreak Invitational T20 took place in 2022: run in conjunction with Cricket Hong Kong, the tournament was originally scheduled to take place in Hong Kong, but was moved to Dubai due to COVID-19 restrictions in Hong Kong. The inaugural tournament saw players from 35 countries take part, spread across six teams. The tournament was won by Tornadoes, who beat Falcons in the final by 8 wickets.

The second edition of the tournament is due to take place in April 2023, at Kowloon Cricket Club in Hong Kong, and the third edition of the tournament is due to take place in September 2023, in Houston, Texas, USA.

Teams

Tournament results

References

FairBreak Invitational T20
Women's Twenty20 cricket competitions
Twenty20 cricket leagues
Sports leagues established in 2022